The inauguration of William Henry Harrison as the ninth president of the United States was held on Thursday, March 4, 1841, at the East Portico of the United States Capitol in Washington, D.C. This was the 14th inauguration and marked the commencement of the only four-year term of both William Henry Harrison as president and John Tyler as vice president. The presidential oath of office was administered to Harrison by Chief Justice Roger B. Taney. Harrison died  days into his term, the first U.S. president to die in office and has the shortest presidential term in American history. Tyler then succeeded to the presidency, creating precedence which would be followed seven more times before it was officially regulated through the Twenty-fifth Amendment in 1967.

Details
Harrison's inauguration was marked by several novelties; he was the first president-elect to arrive in Washington, D.C. by train, and for the first time an official inaugural committee of citizens had formed to plan the day's parade and inaugural ball.

At  of age at the time of his inauguration, he was the oldest president-elect to take office until Ronald Reagan in 1981.

Harrison's wife, Anna, was too ill to travel when her husband left Ohio for his inauguration, and she decided not to accompany him to Washington. Harrison asked his daughter-in-law Jane Irwin Harrison, widow of his namesake son, to accompany him and act as hostess until Anna's proposed arrival in May.

The outgoing president Martin Van Buren did not attend Harrison's inauguration, making him the third president up to that time to do so (John Adams and John Quincy Adams being the others). While Van Buren and Harrison were on good personal terms, Van Buren was still smarting from the Whig party's attacks on him during the campaign. His son Martin Jr. was also ill, which may have led him to skip the ceremony. Instead, he stayed at the Capitol signing legislation until just before the ceremony began.

The day of the inauguration was overcast with cold wind and a noon temperature estimated to be , but the president-elect chose to not wear an overcoat, hat, or gloves for the ceremony. Harrison delivered the longest inaugural address to date, running 8,445 words. He wrote the entire speech himself, though it was edited by soon-to-be Secretary of State, Daniel Webster.  Webster said afterwards that in the process of reducing the text, he had "killed seventeen Roman proconsuls". That evening Harrison attended three inaugural balls, including one at Carusi's Saloon entitled the "Tippecanoe" ball, which at a price of US$10 per person attracted 1000 guests.

On March 26, Harrison developed a cold. According to the prevailing medical misconception of that time, it was believed that his illness was directly caused by the bad weather at his inauguration; however, Harrison's illness did not arise until more than three weeks after the event. Despite doctors' attempts at treating him, Harrison died on April 4 from pneumonia that developed from the cold. The first president to die in office, his presidency was, and remains the shortest in American history.

See also
Presidency of William Henry Harrison
1840 United States presidential election

References

External links

More documents from the Library of Congress
Text of W.H. Harrison's Inaugural Address

Harrison
Harrison, Will
Harrison
Inauguration
March 1841 events